The Battle of Suipacha was fought on 7 November 1810 in Bolivia during the Bolivian War of Independence between the Spanish colonial army and the Republican forces sent by the Primera Junta from Buenos Aires. At the time Bolivia was known as Upper Peru (Alto Perú). It was the first decisive defeat of the Royalists by Republican forces.

Background
An earlier rebellion in Upper Peru during 1809 had been crushed by Royalist forces under the command of Generals Vicente Nieto and José de Córdoba y Rojas, leaving the region firmly under Spanish control. After the 1810 May Revolution, the Republicans sent an expeditionary army, led by Antonio González Balcarce, to Upper Peru with the mission of conducting a reconnaissance of the region.  Departing from Buenos Aires, its ranks swelled en route as volunteers joined the march. Among these was a group of gauchos led by Martín Miguel de Güemes, who would go on to play a key role in the southern revolution.  By the time the expedition reached Upper Peru, it was 600 men strong with 10 field pieces.

A swift action
After an earlier action at Cotagaita on 27 October in which they were repulsed, Republican forces withdrew and occupied a position on the southern bank of the Suipacha River, around the small town of Nazareno. Having received reinforcements, the Royalists attacked this position with 800 men and 2 field guns, but were beaten when the Republicans counter-attacked their left flank. Subsequently the Republicans were able to attack the Royalists camp and force a general withdrawal. The battle had last only 30 minutes.  The victory was also followed by a general uprising in Upper Peru, which led to the capture and execution of the Spanish Governor Francisco de Paula Sanz at Potosi. Royalist generals Nieto and Córdoba were also shot by a firing squad. The Republican army then continued to advance north to the Desaguadero River.

Aftermath
The victory at Suipacha had a strong effect on morale, which was shown in the celebrations in Potosí on November 10 and in Buenos Aires where the Junta authorized all the combatants to wear an arm band with the inscription "La patria a los vencedores de Tupiza" (the motherland to the victors of Tupiza). From a political point of view, the battle was decisive, because it did secure for a long time the hegemony of the Revolutionary forces over the major part of the former Viceroyalty of the Río de la Plata.

The Tupiza battle honour arm patch is kept by the 2nd Infantry Regiment of the Argentine Army in its dress uniforms.

Footnotes

External links

 Historia of Salta
 Castelli in Upper Peru

Battles involving Bolivia
Conflicts in 1810
Battles of the Spanish American wars of independence
Battles of the Argentine War of Independence
Battles of the Bolivian War of Independence
1810 in Bolivia
Battles involving Spain
November 1810 events
History of Potosí Department